The 2018–19 Biathlon World Cup – Stage 1 was the opening event of the season and was held in Pokljuka, Slovenia, from 2–9 December 2018.

Schedule of events 
The events took place at the following times.

Medal winners

Men

Women

Mixed

Achievements 

 Best individual performance for all time

 , 2nd place in Individual
 , 2nd place in Sprint
 , 6th place in Sprint
 , 9th place in Individual
 , 13th place in Individual
 , 14th place in Individual
 , 14th place in Pursuit
 , 17th place in Individual
 , 18th place in Individual
 , 24th place in Individual
 , 25th place in Individual
 , 28th place in Pursuit
 , 32nd place in Sprint
 , 41st place in Pursuit
 , 48th place in Individual
 , 72nd place in Sprint
 , 83rd place in Individual
 , 91st place in Individual
 , 103rd place in Sprint
 , 1st place in Individual
 , 2nd place in Individual
 , 3rd place in Individual
 , 4th place in Sprint
 , 6th place in Pursuit
 , 8th place in Sprint
 , 10th place in Sprint
 , 13th place in Individual
 , 13th place in Sprint
 , 18th place in Individual
 , 36th place in Individual
 , 47th place in Pursuit
 , 48th place in Pursuit
 , 66th place in Sprint
 , 84th place in Sprint
 , 91st place in Sprint

 First individual World Cup race

 , 44th place in Individual
 , 62nd place in Individual
 , 77th place in Individual
 , 95th place in Individual
 , 97th place in Sprint
 , 99th place in Individual
 , 100th place in Sprint
 , 104th place in Sprint
 , 105th place in Individual
 , 106th place in Individual
 , 31st place in Individual
 , 42nd place in Individual
 , 44th place in Individual
 , 66th place in Individual
 , 75th place in Sprint
 , 77th place in Individual
 , 87th place in Individual
 , 99th place in Individual
 , 101st place in Individual

References 

Biathlon World Cup - Stage 1, 2017-18
2018–19 Biathlon World Cup
Biathlon World Cup - Stage 1
Biathlon competitions in Slovenia